Erla Þorsteinsdóttir  may refer to:
Erla Þorsteinsdóttir (basketball) (born 1978), Icelandic basketball player
Erla Þorsteinsdóttir (singer) (born 1933), Icelandic singer